Edward Anthony Rucinski (July 12, 1916April 22, 1995) was a professional American football player who played end for six seasons for the Brooklyn Dodgers, Chicago Cardinals and "Card-Pitt" of the National Football League. Rucinski was named to the 1939 College Football All Polish-American Team.  He played college football at Indiana University where he was a member of Sigma Pi fraternity. He died in Florida on April 22, 1995.

Personal life
Rucinski was married to Mae Tilly.  He had a daughter named Suzie and a stepson named John.  After leaving football he moved to California.  In the 1970s he moved to Indian Rocks Beach, Florida, where he was a member of St. Jerome's Catholic Church, and opened a medical supply business in St. Petersburg, Florida.

References

1916 births
1995 deaths
American people of Polish descent
American football ends
Card-Pitt players
Brooklyn Dodgers (NFL) players
Chicago Cardinals players
Indiana Hoosiers football players
Sportspeople from East Chicago, Indiana
Players of American football from Indiana
American Catholics